Feed the Fire may refer to:

Feed the Fire (Timothy B. Schmit album), 2001
Feed the Fire (Betty Carter album), 1994
Feed the Fire (Steppenwolf album), 1996
Feed the Fire (Samuel Mancini album), 2021